Nicholas Stromberg Robinson (born November 2, 1979) is a former college basketball head coach for Southern Utah University and current assistant coach for the Brigham Young University Cougars.

Early life and education
Born in Liberty, Missouri, Robinson graduated from Liberty High School in 1998. After high school, Robinson went on a two-year LDS mission to Maceió, Brazil. In 2000, Robinson enrolled at Stanford University, where he would play on the Stanford Cardinal men's basketball team from 2001 to 2005, under coach Mike Montgomery in the first three years and Trent Johnson in his last. He was team captain in his junior and senior years, including the 2003–04 season in which Stanford went 30–2, a season which featured a game-winning shot from him against Arizona. Robinson averaged 8.2 points and 4.6 rebounds in his senior season. Robinson graduated in 2005 with a bachelor's degree in political science and master's degree in sociology.

Coaching career
Robinson was a volunteer assistant coach at Rio Rancho High School in Rio Rancho, New Mexico in the 2005–06 season. The following season, Robinson returned to Stanford to become men's basketball director of operations, again under Trent Johnson. Stanford promoted Robinson to assistant coach the following year. In the 2008–09 season, Robinson was assistant at NAIA William Jewell College.

Reuniting with Trent Johnson at LSU in 2009, Robinson first served as Johnson's executive assistant for the 2009–10 season and director of operations in 2010–11 before becoming an assistant coach again in the 2011–12 season.

From 2012 to 2016, Robinson was head coach at Southern Utah. Robinson went 28–90 in four years and was fired on March 9, 2016.

Robinson was hired to be an assistant coach at Seattle University men's basketball ahead of the 2017-2018 season. In April 2019, he was named as an assistant coach to Mark Pope at Brigham Young University.

Head coaching record

References

1979 births
Living people
American Latter Day Saints
American men's basketball coaches
American men's basketball players
American Mormon missionaries in Brazil
Basketball coaches from Missouri
Basketball players from Missouri
College men's basketball head coaches in the United States
Forwards (basketball)
High school basketball coaches in New Mexico
People from Liberty, Missouri
LSU Tigers basketball coaches
Southern Utah Thunderbirds men's basketball coaches
Stanford Cardinal men's basketball players
Stanford Cardinal men's basketball coaches